The All-Ireland Junior Hurling Championship was a hurling competition organized by the Gaelic Athletic Association in Ireland. The competition was originally contested by the second teams of the strong counties, and the first teams of the weaker counties. In the years from 1961 to 1973 and from 1997 until now, the strong counties have competed for the All-Ireland Intermediate Hurling Championship instead. The competition was then restricted to the weaker counties. The competition was discontinued after 2004 as these counties now compete for the Nicky Rackard Cup instead.
From 1974 to 1982, the original format of the competition was abandoned, and the competition was incorporated in Division 3 of the National Hurling League. The original format, including the strong hurling counties was re-introduced in 1983.

Top winners

Roll of honour

 First game disputed – replay ordered

See also
 Connacht Junior Hurling Championship
 Leinster Junior Hurling Championship
 Munster Junior Hurling Championship
 Ulster Junior Hurling Championship

All-Ireland inter-county hurling championships